Boz Quch-e Olya (also Romanized as Boz Qūch-e ‘Olyā and Bozqūch-e ‘Olyā; also known as Boz Qūch-e Bālā (Persian: بزقوچ بالا), Bozqūch Bālā, Buzqūch, and Boz Qūch) is a village in Kahshang Rural District, in the Central District of Birjand County, South Khorasan Province, Iran. At the 2006 census, its population was 74, in 22 families.

References 

Populated places in Birjand County